Kelvin Cruickshank is a New Zealand psychic medium. Kelvin Cruickshank was born and raised in the Waikato region of New Zealand. Cruiskshank was known for being on the New Zealand television show Sensing Murder. During 2020 Crusikshank was working on Reel and Rifle with KC, a planned outdoor adventure show.

See also
Jeanette Wilson
Deb Webber
Sue Nicolson

References

External links

People from Ngāruawāhia
New Zealand psychics
New Zealand television personalities
Living people
Year of birth missing (living people)